The Special Operations Command (SOCOMD) is an Australian Defence Force command that was established on 5 May 2003 to unite all of the Australian Army's special forces units and by 2008 was fully operational. Australia's Special Operations Command is of equivalent status to Australia's Fleet, Forces and Air Commands. It is modelled on the equivalent commands in the United States and British military forces, and is led by a major general as Special Operations Commander Australia (SOCAUST).

The origins of SOCOMD began in 1979 with the army creating a small Directorate Special Action Forces—Army. On 13 February 1990, Headquarters Special Forces was established, which was renamed in 1997 to Headquarters Special Operations and in 2003 to Special Operations Headquarters or SOCOMD.

History

East Timor (May 2006 – 2007)
Security for the 2006 Commonwealth Games in Melbourne (March 2006)
Afghanistan (2001–02) (2005–06) (2007–2021)
Iraq (2003–09) (2014–)
Security for the 2003 Rugby World Cup (October – November 2003)
Security for President George W. Bush's visit to Canberra (October 2003)

While Special Operations Command had not formally commenced operations at the time, it appears that the headquarters may have overseen the boarding of the North Korean freighter MV Pong Su in April 2003, which involved elements of both the Special Air Service Regiment and 4th Battalion, Royal Australian Regiment (Commando) Tactical Assault Groups.

In November 2018, the 30th Asia-Pacific Economic Cooperation (APEC) meeting held in Port Moresby in Papua New Guinea had Special Operations Command involvement to enhance the Papua New Guinea Defence Force's Incident Response Group to provide security as world leaders, including Scott Morrison, Mike Pence, Xi Jinping, Dmitry Medvedev and other government and economic leaders were in attendance. The Incident Response Group had received extensive training to build its capabilities in preparation for the meeting from SOCOMD units and the New Zealand Special Operations Component Command.

Structure

Order of battle

Headquarters, Special Operations Command Headquarters (SOHQ) (GJBC and Russell Offices)
 Headquarters, Special Forces Group
Special Air Service Regiment (Swanbourne, WA)  Incorporates the role of Tactical Assault Group (West).
 1 Squadron
 3 Squadron
 4 Squadron
 152 Signals Squadron
 Specialist Support Squadron
 Operational Support Squadron
1st Commando Regiment a mixed Regular Army and Army Reserve Unit 
 Regimental Headquarters (Randwick Barracks, Sydney)
 1 Commando Company (HMAS Penguin, Sydney)
 2 Commando Company (Williamstown, VIC)
 301 Signals Squadron (Randwick Barracks, Sydney with elements in the commando companies)
2nd Commando Regiment (Holsworthy, NSW)  Incorporates the role of Tactical Assault Group (East).
 A Company
 B Company
 C Company
 D Company
 126 Signals Squadron
 Operations Support Company
 Logistics Support Company
Special Operations Engineer Regiment (Holsworthy, NSW)
 A Squadron
 B Squadron
 Logistic Support Troop
 Special Operations Logistics Squadron (Holsworthy, NSW)
 Defence Special Operations Training and Education Centre (Holsworthy, NSW)
 Australian Defence Force School of Special Operations (Holsworthy, NSW)
 Australian Defence Force Parachuting School (HMAS Albatross, NSW)

Special Operations Commander Australia (SOCAUST)
The Special Operations Commander Australia (SOCAUST) is responsible for the peacetime 'raise, train and sustain' functions of Special Operations Command reporting to the Chief of Army, while the Chief of Joint Operations is responsible for the operational functions of Special Operations Command deployments. The SOCAUST is responsible for the domestic counter-terrorism deployments of Special Operations Command reporting directly to the Chief of the Defence Force.

The following have held the position of Special Operations Commander Australia, with the ranks and honours as at the completion of their tenure:

See also
Special Operations Command (New Zealand)
United States Special Operations Command Pacific
Canadian Special Operations Forces Command

Notes

Further reading

 

Commands of the Australian Defence Force
Military units and formations of the Australian Army
Special forces of Australia
Leadership of the Australian Defence Force
Military of Australia
Australian Defence Force
Military units and formations established in 2003